Prince  also known as Iyemasa, was a Japanese political figure of the Taishō and early Shōwa periods. He was the 17th hereditary head of the former shogunal branch of the Tokugawa clan and the final President of the House of Peers in the Diet of Japan.

Biography
Iemasa Tokugawa was born in what is now the Sendagaya district of Tokyo, as the eldest son of Tokugawa Iesato and his wife, Konoe Hiroko, daughter of Konoe Tadafusa. He graduated from the law school of Tokyo Imperial University in 1909, and accepted a post in the diplomatic corps of Foreign Ministry the same year. In 1924, he was appointed Consul-general to the Japanese consulate in Sydney, Australia. In 1929, he was appointed Envoy to Canada and from 1937 to 1939 served as the Japanese ambassador to Turkey.

Iemasa often allied with his father Prince Tokugawa Iesato (aka Prince Iyesato Tokugawa) in promoting international goodwill projects between Japan and Europe, Canada, and United States. The Art of Peace book cover photo illustration presents Iemasa accompanying his father as his father receives an honorary doctor of laws degree from the president of the University of Southern California in 1934. During that same year, on May 10, 1934, Iyemasa was also recognized for his humanitarian and goodwill diplomatic efforts by a prominent North American University and was given an honorary doctor of laws degree from the University of British Columbia in Canada.

In 1940, on the death of his father, he inherited the title of kōshaku ("prince") under the kazoku peerage system, and a seat as a member of the House of Peers of the Diet of Japan. On June 19, 1946, he served as the President of the House of Peers, a post which he held until May 2, 1947, when the Allied occupation authorities authorized the current Constitution of Japan abolishing the House of Peers.

He died of heart disease at his home in Shibuya, Tokyo, on February 18, 1963, and was posthumously awarded the Order of the Rising Sun with Paulownia Flowers, 1st class. His grave is located at the Yanaka Cemetery in Tokyo. He was succeeded as head of the Tokugawa clan by Tsunenari Tokugawa, his grandson from Yasuko Tokugawa with Matsudaira Ichiro, son of Tsuneo Matsudaira.

Family

 Father: Tokugawa Iesato
 Mother: Konoe Hiroko (1867-1944)
 Wife: Naoko Tokugawa（This marriage was decided by the will of Tenshō-in, who raised Tokugawa Iesato.）
 Children
 Iehide Tokugawa (1912-1936)
 Toyoko Tokugawa married Ichiro Matsudaira, son of Tsuneo Matsudaira
 Toshiko Tokugawa married Uesugi Takanori
 Junko Tokugawa married Hoshina Mitsumasa
 Grandchild:
Tsunenari Tokugawa from Toyoko Tokugawa

References

 Banno, Junji. The Establishment of the Japanese Constitutional System. Routledge (1992). 
Lebra, Sugiyama Takie. Above the Clouds: Status Culture of the Modern Japanese Nobility. University of California Press (1995). 
 Sims, Richard. Japanese Political History Since the Meiji Renovation 1868–2000. Palgrave Macmillan.

External links
Yanaka Cemetery (Japanese)
Introduction to an illustrated biography titled The Art of Peace that highlights Prince Iyesato Tokugawa and his son Iemasa Tokugawa 

1884 births
1963 deaths
Kazoku
People from Tokyo
University of Tokyo alumni
Tokugawa clan
Members of the House of Peers (Japan)
Ambassadors of Japan to Turkey
Recipients of the Order of the Rising Sun with Paulownia Flowers